Takydromus sauteri, known commonly as the Koshun grass lizard, is a species of lizard in the family Lacertidae. The species is endemic to Orchid Island in Taiwan.

Etymology
The specific name, sauteri, is in honor of German entomologist Hans Sauter.

Description
The dorsum of T. sauteri is bright green. The upper lip and the venter are white.

The tail is very long, 4.2 times the snout-to-vent length (SVL).

Reproduction
T. sauteri is oviparous.

References

Further reading
Arnold EN (1997). "Interrelationships and evolution of the east Asian grass lizards, Takydromus (Squamata: Lacertidae)". Zoological Journal of the Linnean Society 119 (2): 267–296.
Lin SM, Chen CA, Lue KY (2002). "Molecular Phylogeny and Biogeography of Grass Lizards Genus Takydromus (Reptilia: Lacertidae) of East Asia". Molecular Phylogenetics and Evolution 22 (2): 276–288.
Schlüter U (2003). Die Langschwanzeidechsen der Gattung Takydromus. Karlsruhe, Germany: Kirschner & Seufer Verlag. 110 pp. . (Takydromus sauteri, p. 67). (in German).
Stejneger L (1910). "The Batrachians and Reptiles of Formosa". Proceedings of the United States National Museum 38: 91–114. (Takydromus sauteri, p. 101).
Van Denburgh J (1909). "New and Previously Unrecorded Species of Reptiles and Amphibians from the Island of Formosa". Proceedings of the California Academy of Sciences, Fourth Series 3: 49–56. (Takydromus sauteri, new species, p. 50).

Takydromus
Reptiles described in 1909
Taxa named by John Van Denburgh
Endemic fauna of Taiwan
Reptiles of Taiwan